Rise & Shine (2010) is the second album by Sierra Leone's Refugee All Stars, following their debut album Living Like a Refugee (2006). The album was produced by Steve Berlin, renowned for his work with Los Lobos, Angélique Kidjo, Michelle Shocked, Rickie Lee Jones and Ozomatli, and recorded in their hometown of Freetown, Sierra Leone and New Orleans, Louisiana. Reflecting the influences of both recording locations, the album's sound is "a fusion of traditional West African music and roots reggae, inflected with New Orleans styles."

Track listing

References

Sierra Leone's Refugee All Stars albums
2010 albums